JHW-007 is a cocaine analog and a high affinity atypical dopamine reuptake inhibitor that is being researched for the treatment of cocaine addiction. JHW-007 has been found to blunt the psychostimulatory effects of cocaine and reduce self-administration in rodents. JHW-007 exposure has been shown to block the conditioned place preference effects of cocaine. JHW-007 may directly antagonize the autoregulatory dopamine D2 receptor, a hypothesis that was developed following the observation of JHW-007's ability to inhibit D2 receptor-mediated currents in the midbrain. 

JHW-007 is unrelated to JWH-007, a synthetic cannabinoid receptor agonist.

Atypical dopamine reuptake inhibition 
In contrast to cocaine and other cocaine-like dopamine reuptake inhibitors, JHW-007 binds to the dopamine transporter (DAT) in an occluded (closed) conformation, similar to R-modafinil. This type of receptor binding to the DAT has been observed to result in a gradual and sustained increase in extracellular dopamine in the nucleus accumbens. Peak levels of extracellular dopamine are also markedly reduced. Both modafinil and JHW-007 have been investigated for the treatment of cocaine addiction.

References 

  
Dopamine reuptake inhibitors
Stimulants